Ṣ (minuscule: ṣ) is a letter of the Latin alphabet, formed from an S with the addition of a dot below the letter. Its uses include:

 In the Alvarez/Hale orthography of the Tohono Oʼodham language to represent retroflex  (Akimel O'odham and Saxton/Saxton use <sh> instead)
 the transliteration of Indic languages to represent retroflex 
 the transcription of Afro-Asiatic languages (mostly Semitic languages) to represent an "emphatic s"  as in Arabic ص (Ṣād) and as in the Hebrew צ (Tzadi/Ṣādī) spoken by the Jews of Yemen and North Africa
 the orthography of Yoruba in Nigeria to represent the voiceless palato-alveolar sibilant (the English "sh" sound)

In HTML these are Ṣ: &#7778; and ṣ: &#7779;.

The Unicode codepoints are U+1E62 for Ṣ and U+1E63 for ṣ in Latin Extended Additional range.

See also
Tsade
Dot (diacritic)

Latin letters with diacritics
Eastern Aramaic languages
Neo-Aramaic languages